Agdistis arenbergeri is a moth in the family Pterophoridae. It is known to reside in South Africa.

References

Endemic moths of South Africa
Agdistinae
Moths of Africa
Plume moths of Africa
Moths described in 1986